Ion Țurai (January 17, 1907–September 21, 1970) was a Romanian surgeon and anatomist.

He practiced surgery at the Brâncovenesc Hospital and then at military hospitals in Târgoviște and Bucharest. From 1948 to 1970 he was a professor of practice at the Floreasca Hospital, specializing in emergency medical care. In 1951 Țurai was ordered to Korea to provide medical assistance to the communist forces during the Korean War; according to a CIA report from that time, he tried to avoid going by producing a medical certificate, but his request was denied.

Țurai was elected a corresponding member of the Romanian Academy in 1955. From 1952 to 1957 he served as deputy to the Great National Assembly for the Drăgănești district of the București Region.

He was the author of several medical books, especially relating to various surgery techniques. Their experimental research is very valuable and it always makes me especially happy to find the name of Professor Țurai quoted in international bibliographies."

Publications

Notes

1907 births
1970 deaths
Romanian surgeons
Romanian anatomists
Corresponding members of the Romanian Academy
Physicians from Bucharest
Romanian military doctors
People of the Korean War
20th-century Romanian politicians
Romanian medical writers
Members of the Great National Assembly
20th-century surgeons